David Arias Pérez  (22 July 1929 – 9 May 2019) was a Spanish-born Recollect friar who served as an auxiliary bishop of the Archdiocese of Newark from 1983 to 2004.

Biography
Born in Mataluenga, part of the municipality of Las Omañas, in the Province of Leon, Spain, Arias entered the Order of Augustinian Recollects in 1946. He began his seminary studies in 1948 in Monachil and was ordained a priest in Barcelona on 31 May 1952. He was then assigned to teach Natural Sciences briefly in a local school, before beginning advanced studies in theology at the Teresianum Institute in Rome, where he received a Diploma in 1964.

He was sent by the Order to serve in their houses in North America, first in Mexico City, then in Kansas City, Missouri. He taught theology at the seminary of the Order there.

On 25 January 1983, he was appointed by Pope John Paul II as auxiliary bishop for the Archdiocese of Newark and was consecrated on the following 7 April. He was entrusted with the pastoral care of the growing Hispanic population of the region, representing their interests at various situations on the national level. Arias retired from this office on 21 May 2004.

In 2008, on the 25th anniversary of his consecration as bishop, his hometown of Villaviciosa de la Ribera in Leon renamed the town square in his honor.

Bibliography 

 Rafael Lazcano, Episcopologio agustiniano. Agustiniana, Guadarrama (Madrid), 2014, vol. I, p. 592-596.

See also
 

 Catholic Church hierarchy
 Catholic Church in the United States
 Historical list of the Catholic bishops of the United States
 List of Catholic bishops of the United States
 Lists of patriarchs, archbishops, and bishops

References

External links
Roman Catholic Archdiocese of Newark Official Site

1929 births
2019 deaths
People from the Province of León
Augustinian Recollects
Spanish expatriates in the United States
Augustinian Recollect bishops
Clergy from Newark, New Jersey
Spanish Roman Catholic titular bishops
Spanish Roman Catholic bishops in North America
Roman Catholic bishops in the United States